The 2019 Columbus Challenger was a professional tennis tournament played on indoor hard courts. It was the sixth edition of the tournament which was part of the 2019 ATP Challenger Tour. It took place in Columbus, United States between 7 and 13 January 2019.

Singles main draw entrants

Seeds

 1 Rankings are as of December 31, 2018.

Other entrants
The following players received entry into the singles main draw as wildcards:
  Martin Joyce
  John McNally
  Kyle Seelig
  Mikael Torpegaard
  J. J. Wolf

The following players received entry into the singles main draw using their ITF World Tennis Ranking:
  Tom Jomby
  Fabien Reboul
  Jelle Sels
  João Souza

The following players received entry from the qualifying draw:
  Gijs Brouwer
  João Menezes

Champions

Singles

 J. J. Wolf def.  Mikael Torpegaard 6–7(4–7), 6–3, 6–4.

Doubles

 Maxime Cressy /  Bernardo Saraiva def.  Robert Galloway /  Nathaniel Lammons 7–5, 7–6(7–3).

References

External links
 Official website

Columbus Challenger
2019 in American tennis
January 2019 sports events in the United States